36 Street E, Métis Trail, and Dwight McLellan Trail is a major arterial road in eastern Calgary and Rocky View County, Alberta. It connects with residential neighborhoods and commercial corridors in northeast Calgary. 

Métis Trail, a developing freeway along the east side of Calgary International Airport, and becomes Dwight McLellan Trail upon reaching Rocky View County.

Route description

36 Street E 
36 Street SE begins at 50 Avenue SE in an industrial area next to the CNR Sarcee Yard. North of Peigan Trail, 36 Street SE passes through residential areas of Greater Forest Lawn before crossing into the northeast quadrant at Memorial Drive, becoming 36 Street NE.

North of Memorial Drive, 36 Street NE becomes a commercial and retail corridor, passing northeast Calgary's main shopping malls of Marlborough Mall and Sunridge Mall, as well as Pacific Place Mall and the Peter Lougheed Hospital. The Blue Line of the CTrain LRT runs between the northbound and southbound lanes, with stations located at Marlborough (near Marlborough Mall), Rundle (near Sunridge Mall), and Whitehorn station. Unlike Crowchild Trail which is grade-separated, most cross streets are signalized intersections with at-grade LRT crossings. At McKnight Boulevard, 36 Street NE becomes Métis Trail.

A northern section of 36 Street NE exists as a collector road northeast of the McKnight Boulevard / Métis Trail / 36 Street NE interchange. Beginning at 48 Avenue NE, which continues west to Barlow Trail, it follows the former road allowance along the eastern boundary of the Calgary International Airport, to Country Hills Boulevard. It  serves as the eastern terminus for Airport Trail, just east of the Airport Tunnel, and was expanded in 2013 to handle additional traffic. As part of the development of the Stonegate Landing business park, the plan is reconstruct 36 Street NE north of Country Hills Boulevard to 128 Avenue NE and become Barlow Circle.

Métis Trail 
Métis Trail begins at McKnight Boulevard and continues north as a limited-access road. Just north of the McKnight Boulevard interchange, the CTrain shifts to the east side of the roadway. Métis Trail diverts slightly to the northeast, before continuing north beyond 64 Avenue NE as a 4-6 lane roadway, . The roadway continues north, crossing Stoney Trail before leaving the City of Calgary. Métis Trail was originally constructed with provision to be upgraded to freeway standards; however, the City of Calgary has since downgraded the classification to an arterial street so it remains to be seen if the route will ever be upgraded. Métis Trail functions as a boundary between residential areas to the east and commercial and light industrial to the west.

The roadway was originally known as 36 Street NE south of 64 Avenue NE and 44 Street NE to the north; it was renamed to Métis Trail in 2006.

Dwight McLellan Trail 
Dwight McLellan Trail begins at the Calgary city limits at 144 Avenue NE, just north of the Stoney Trail interchange. It continues through Wagon Wheel Industrial Park in Rocky View County to Highway 566 before it continues north as Range Road 293. It functions as an alternate access from Calgary to CrossIron Mills and Century Downs Racetrack and Casino. The roadway is named after the late Dwight McLellan, a Calgary businessman and real estate developer who envisioned the commercial and horse racetrack development, but passed away in 2008 prior to the start of construction.

Major intersections 
From north to south.

See also 

Transportation in Calgary

References 

Roads in Calgary